Kate Nicholson (July 1929 – 18 April 2019) was a British painter and the daughter of artist Ben Nicholson and his first wife, the artist Winifred Nicholson.

Biography
Born at Bankshead, Banks, Cumberland in 1929, Nicholson was a pupil at Claremont College during World War II, which had evacuated to Wales.

Nicholson studied at the Bath Academy of Art from 1949 to 1954 where she was a pupil of Peter Lanyon, a St Ives artist and friend of her father and her stepmother Barbara Hepworth. She taught art at Totnes High School for two years before she moved to St Ives herself in 1957 and became a member of the Penwith Society of Arts.  She painted alongside her mother in the 1960s and 1970s, the two often visiting Greece together, as well as North Africa, and to the Isle of Eigg in the Hebrides in 1980.
 
In addition to Kate and her parents, the Nicholson family also produced other artists, including her grandparents, William Nicholson and Mabel Pryde, aunt Nancy Nicholson, and half-brother Simon Nicholson, and half-sister painter Rachel Nicholson, as well as architect Christopher Nicholson, her uncle.

Nicholson died in 2019, aged 89.

Solo exhibitions 

 1959 Waddington Gallery
 1962 Waddington Gallery
 1966 Marjorie Parr Gallery
 1968 Marjorie Parr Gallery
 1970 Marjorie Parr Gallery
 1972 Mignon Gallery, Bath
 1974 Northern Arts Gallery, Newcastle
 1975 LYC Museum and Art Gallery
 1981 LYC Museum and Art Gallery
 1985 Wills Lane Gallery, St Ives
 2013 Belgrave Gallery, St Ives
 2016 Belgrave Gallery, St Ives
 2019 Falmouth Art Gallery

See also 
 List of St. Ives artists

Further reading 
 David Brown St Ives 1939–64: Twenty Five Years of Painting, Sculpture and Pottery, The Tate Gallery, 1985 
 Christopher Andreae Kate Nicholson, Belgrave Gallery, St Ives, 2013

References

External links
 
 Kate Nicholson, paintings in Kettle's Yard collection

1929 births
2019 deaths
English women painters
Kate
21st-century British women artists
21st-century English women
21st-century English people